The Bravery Council of Australia Meeting 75 Honours List was announced by the Governor General of Australia on 22 August 2011.

Awards were announced for 
the Star of Courage,
the Bravery Medal,
Commendation for Brave Conduct and
Group Bravery Citation.

Star of Courage (SC)
Lorraine Casey, Victoria
Charles Zerafa, Tasmania

Bravery Medal (BM)

Commendation for Brave Conduct
Timothy Arnold, New South Wales
Anthony Ayres, Queensland
Shane Brown, Victoria
Senior Constable Cameron Caine, Victoria Police
Dan Campbell, New South Wales
Benjamin Carroll, Queensland
Glen Damro, Queensland
Frank Engels, Victoria
Ricky French, Tasmania
Steven Gatenby, Queensland
John Granger, Queensland
Nicholas Gregorski, Queensland
Robert Grimson, New South Wales
Scott Hahne, Queensland
Arthur Harris, New South Wales
Peter Hocking, New South Wales
Darren Horne, Victoria
Senior Constable Kerri Johnson, Queensland Police
Senior Constable Daniel Jones, Victoria Police
Enes Kaya, Western Australia
Aaron Kell, New South Wales
Detective Constable Grant Lutz, Queensland Police
Samantha Marshall, Queensland
Peter Newall, Tasmania
Carl Niki, New South Wales
Constable Bernard Nyhan, Queensland Police
Thomas Reeve, New South Wales
Nicholas Sherry, New South Wales
Senior Constable Mark Simpson, Queensland Police
Jennifer Small, New South Wales
Senior Constable Ian Thompson, Victoria Police
Senior Constable Adrian Venz, Queensland Police
Leading Senior Constable Roger Wood, Victoria Police
Slavica Zdravavkovic, Victoria

Group Bravery Citation
Darren Evans, Queensland
Darren Simpson, Queensland
Mark Steffen, Queensland
Adrian Williams, Queensland

References

Governor General of Australia, Honours List's

Orders, decorations, and medals of Australia
2011 awards